Talvik may refer to:

Places
Alta-Talvik, a former municipality in Finnmark county, Norway
Talvik (municipality), a former municipality in Finnmark county, Norway
Talvik, Norway, village in Alta municipality in Finnmark county, Norway
Talvik Church, a church in Alta municipality in Finnmark county, Norway

People
Artur Talvik (born 1964),  Estonian filmmaker and politician
Heiti Talvik (1904–1947), Estonian poet
Mati Talvik (1942–2018), Estonian television journalist
Merle Talvik (born 1954), Estonian actress
Sofia Talvik (born 1978), Swedish musician and singer/songwriter
Tiina Talvik (1938–2021), Estonian pediatrician, medical scientist and educator

Estonian-language surnames